Sharon Lee "Sherrie" Maricle (born September 2, 1963, Buffalo, New York) is an American jazz drummer.

Maricle's musical education began in the fourth grade when she started with the clarinet after being told that the trumpet was off-limits to girls. She moved on to the cello and settled on the drums in the sixth grade after seeing Buddy Rich play. Maricle began playing professionally, performing locally with Slam Stewart, while studying music (BA 1985) at SUNY-Binghamton. She then moved to New York City and attended New York University where she completed a Master's of Arts in Jazz Performance in 1986 and a Doctorate of Philosophy in Jazz Performance/Composition in 2000. In the late 1980s, she was appointed director of percussion studies at NYU.

Maricle directed Saturday jam sessions at the Village Gate from 1987 until the venue closed in 1993. Beginning in 1987, she also began collaborating and leading small groups with Peter Appleyard. In the 1990s, she performed with the New York Pops, Clark Terry, and Al Grey and began working with the group DIVA.

Maricle currently leads the DIVA Jazz Orchestra, the DIVA Jazz Trio, and the quintet Five Play. She teaches on the jazz faculty of the New York State Summer Music Festival, as well as running her own private drum and percussion studio. In 2009, she received the Lifetime Achievement Award at the Mary Lou Williams Women in Jazz Festival.

Discography
  Sherrie Maricle With Peter Appleyard, Bill Mays & Lynn Seaton - Live Concert (LRC Ltd., 1993)
  Sherrie Maricle And Diva : I Believe In You (Arbors Records, 2000) 
  Sherrie Maricle And The DIVA Jazz Orchestra - Live in Concert  (2002)
  Sherrie Maricle & The DIVA Jazz Orchestra : Present TNT - A Tommy Newson Tribute (Arbors, 2005)

References

External links 
 Jazz Archive at Duke University 
 Sherrie Maricle Collection, Rubenstein Rare Book and Manuscript Library, Duke University
 Sherrie Maricle at DIVA Jazz
 

American jazz drummers
1963 births
American women jazz musicians
Steinhardt School of Culture, Education, and Human Development alumni
Musicians from Buffalo, New York
Living people
Binghamton University alumni
20th-century American drummers
Jazz musicians from New York (state)
20th-century American women musicians
21st-century American women
Arbors Records artists
New York University alumni
New York University faculty